Henry "Harry" Dupuis (born 24 March 1808, Wendlebury, Oxfordshire; died 3 June 1867, Richmond, Surrey) was an English cricketer with amateur status. He was associated with Cambridge University and made his first-class debut in 1828.

Dupuis was educated at Eton College and at King's College, Cambridge, where he became a Fellow after graduation. He became an assistant master at Eton College and, having been ordained, became Church of England vicar of Richmond, Surrey from 1852 up to his death.

References

Bibliography
 

1808 births
1867 deaths
English cricketers
English cricketers of 1826 to 1863
Cambridge University cricketers
People educated at Eton College
Alumni of King's College, Cambridge
19th-century English Anglican priests